Americans Against Escalation in Iraq (AAEI) is a coalition of advocacy groups (including MoveOn.org, Center for American Progress Action Fund, Americans United for Change, Win Without War, and others) in the United States opposed to the Iraq War.  In June 2007, they launched a multimillion-dollar campaign entitled "Iraq Summer"  aimed at turning public opinion against the war and bringing political pressure against those in the U.S. Congress that support it.  This program involves 100 staff members in 15 states and is focused on 60 members of Congress.

References

External links
 Official website of the organization
 Iraq Summer campaign
 Video: Americans Against Escalation in Iraq tells Susan Collins to bring our troops home

Political organizations based in the United States